Jub Sorkh-e Olya (also Romanized as Jūb Sorkh-e ‘Olyā; also known as Tū Sorkh-e Bālā) is a village in Shabab Rural District, in the Shabab District of Chardavol County, Ilam Province, Iran. At the 2006 census, its population was 338, in 73 families. The village is populated by Kurds.

References 

Populated places in Chardavol County
Kurdish settlements in Ilam Province